Aslan Kerimov (born 1 January 1973) is a retired football midfielder from Azerbaijan. He debuted for the national team in October 1994, and his international career earned him 78 caps.

Career

Club
He started his career in PFC Neftchi, and has since played, almost all, for FK Ganja, Neftchi (second spell), FK Qarabağ, Baltika Kaliningrad, ANS-Pivani, FK Shamkir and now FK Qarabağ for a second time.

Kerimov retired in November 2011, after Sumgayit's 3–0 defeat to Qarabağ in the Azerbaijan Cup.

Career statistics

International

Statistics accurate as of match played 2 February 2008

Honours

Club
Qarabağ
Azerbaijan Top League (1): 1993
Azerbaijan Cup (3): 1993, 2005–06, 2008–09
Kapaz
Azerbaijan Top League (1): 1998–99
Shamkir
Azerbaijan Top League (2): 2000–01, 2001–02

References

External links

1973 births
Soviet footballers
Azerbaijani footballers
Azerbaijan international footballers
Azerbaijani expatriate footballers
Living people
FC Baltika Kaliningrad players
Qarabağ FK players
Footballers from Baku
Association football defenders
Neftçi PFK players